The Automobile Alley neighborhood and Automobile Alley Historic District in Oklahoma City is an upscale Urban area, located roughly along North Broadway Avenue in Downtown Oklahoma City. The district contains numerous low and mid-rise heritage buildings once home to the city's automobile dealerships, that today hosts many of the city's top bars and restaurants, retail shops, and urban residences alongside modern construction consisting mostly of residential housing and hotels. Automobile Alley is listed in the National Historic Register of neighborhoods.

In 2017, Mercedes Benz of Oklahoma City, the last auto dealership remaining in Automobile Alley, announced that it would vacate the present site and move to the suburb of Edmond during 2018. After the move, the Automobile Alley site will be converted to other uses.

History
The Automobile Alley Historic District was primarily developed as a commercial district just north of downtown Oklahoma City. During the 1920s Automobile Alley, A-Alley for short, was a popular auto row, home to more than 2/3 of the city's car dealerships for several decades in the 1900s. Numerous national and international brands had showrooms in Automobile Alley and the district thrived as a commercial hub for the state until the decline of downtown Oklahoma City during the 1970s and 1980s.

Remnants of the city's auto history still exist in Automobile Alley including urban show-palaces for Mercedes Benz of Oklahoma City, Jaguar of Oklahoma City, and Volvo of Oklahoma City, and the Bob Moore Auto Group is located nearby in MidTown. Today, these luxury icons of the automobile industry coexist alongside numerous retail shops, restaurants and bars that have opened in the ground floors of the historic buildings, with office and residential conversions in upper floors.

Subsequent plats continued the same width. Local legend says that the street was designed to be wide enough to allow a full team of horses and wagons to turn around.

Boundaries
Automobile Alley has generally defined as the 20 square city block area north of the Oklahoma City CBD, centered along North Broadway Avenue between N. 13th Street to N 4th Street; where the city's prominent automobile retailers had lavish showrooms, regional headquarters, and maintenance facilities. Today's Automobile Alley has expanded to become a true neighborhood (48 square blocks), engulfing the former Triangle/Flatiron District towards the East; now the district boundaries extends roughly from Robinson Avenue to Interstate 235.

Structures

Historic Buildings in Automobile Alley are noted at night for their colorful neon lighting and advertising displays, including numerous retail signage and building wraps along North Broadway Avenue.

Redevelopment
Since the decline of downtown Oklahoma City in the 1980s there have been successive waves of development that have taken place in Automobile Alley. During the mid-1990s, there was an effort to redevelop the district, with the idea to transform many of the automobile showrooms and storefronts of Alley into upscale residential lofts, galleries, and office space. The city implemented a new streets-cape to define the district and numerous smaller companies brought office workers into previously boarded-up historic buildings, bringing the district back to life.

During the 2000s there was a push of retail development into the district that began with the relocation of the historic, upscale Colcord Oyster Bar from the renovated Colcord Building in the central business district to an Automobile Alley storefront. Additional destination restaurants soon followed included the opening of the Iguana Lounge Grill, Red PrimeSteak; Oklahoma City's premier Zagat-rated urban steak haunt, and the 2015 openings of the ultra-chic 'Broadway 10 Bar & Chop House' and 'Sidecar' Barley Wine Bar. Since 2010 retail shoppes have made the surge into the district where retailers are converting former automobile showrooms on the lower levels of buildings into retail boutiques including Rawhide, PlenTY Mercantile, The Factory, Perch'd Modern clothiers, and Broadway Wine Merchants. Additional developments are announced seemingly every week, further defining AAlley's position as Oklahoma City's upscale retail destination.

Since 2013 the neighborhood has seen the addition of modern residential and hotel projects as Automobile Alley's Eastern border has expanded toward I-235. Major projects include numerous upper floor loft conversions of the historic building stock (mostly along Broadway and Robinson Avenues), and the 2016 opening of the Metropolitan apartment complex. Additional residential projects are currently under construction or have been announced where the influx of new residents to the area likely may redefine Automobile Alley as a complete urban neighborhood to live, work, and play.

The last automobile dealership along Automobile Alley, Mercedes-Benz of Oklahoma City at 1225 North Broadway, plans to vacate its premises in 2018 and move to suburban Edmond. The new location will occupy half of a  building that was constructed to house Volkswagen of Edmond in 2003. The existing Mercedes-Benz building on Broadway was originally constructed in 1985 by Frank Bolen, a car dealer who opened Benchmark Motors inside. Bolen later sold the business to Bob Howard, who turned it in to Mercedes-Benz of Oklahoma City. Howard recently sold the Mercedes-Benz dealership to Mark Moore,

Gallery

Notes

References

Neighborhoods in Oklahoma City
Districts of Downtown Oklahoma City
National Register of Historic Places in Oklahoma City
Historic districts on the National Register of Historic Places in Oklahoma
Economy of Oklahoma City
Shopping districts and streets in the United States
Auto rows
Motor vehicle buildings and structures on the National Register of Historic Places
Transportation buildings and structures on the National Register of Historic Places in Oklahoma